Solmsia is a genus containing one or two species of flowering plants belonging to the family Thymelaeaceae. It is endemic to New Caledonia. The genus  was named to honor Hermann zu Solms-Laubach by Henri Ernest Baillon.  It is related to Arnhemia, Deltaria, Gonystylus and Lethedon.

Species
Solmsia calophylla
Solmsia chrysophylla

References 

Octolepidoideae
Endemic flora of New Caledonia
Malvales genera
Taxa named by Henri Ernest Baillon